Pick 'n' Mix is the second and most recent album by English singer Lolly.

Track listing 

Girls Just Wanna Have Fun 2:53
Per Sempre Amore 2:52
It Never Rains But It Pours 3:02
999 3:44
She Loves You 2:20
I Can't Help Myself 3:37
You Left The Light On 3:23
Just Say Goodbye 3:09
Ti Amo 2:56
Better Than Ever 2:47
Twisting Roads 3:36
Rockin' Robin 2:13
One Plus One 2:39
Listen To Your Heart 3:05
Puppy Love 3:17
Viva La Radio 2:44
Mickey 3:36
Big Boys Don't Cry 3:23

Charts

Weekly

Singles

References

2000 albums
Polydor Records albums
Lolly (singer) albums